Bryn yr Ŵyn, or Hill of the Lambs, is a Dewey in the foothills of Plynlimon between Aberystwyth and Welshpool in Wales. The summit height is 502 m (1647 ft) and the prominence, or relative height, is 32 metres.

References

Mountains and hills of Ceredigion